Covington County Schools (CCS) is a school district in Covington County, Alabama, headquartered in Andalusia.

Schools 
K-12 schools:
 Pleasant Home School (Andalusia)
 Red Level School (Red Level)

High schools:
 Florala High School (Florala)
 Straughn High School (Andalusia)

Junior high schools:
 Fleeta Jr. High School (Opp)
 Straughn Middle School (Andalusia)

Elementary schools:
 Red Level Elementary School (Red Level)
 Straughn Elementary School (Andalusia)
 W.S. Harlan Elementary School (Lockhart)

References

External links 
 Covington County Schools

Covington County, Alabama
School districts in Alabama